Peter Donnelly (born 22 September 1936) is an English former professional footballer.

Born in Hull, Donnelly began his career with Doncaster Rovers but was allowed to leave the club in 1958 to join Scunthorpe United. Finding his feet at Scunthorpe, he went on to score 19 times during his time at the club and his form persuaded Cardiff City to offer Joe Bonson to Scunthorpe in exchange. Signing for the club on their return to Division One, he put in a number of strong performances alongside the club's other main strikers, Derek Tapscott and Graham Moore, but was allowed to leave to join rivals Swansea Town.

Spending one year at Swansea, Donnelly went on to finish his career with spells at Brighton & Hove Albion and Bradford City before later serving as manager of Margate in two separate spells.

References

1936 births
Living people
English footballers
English football managers
Footballers from Kingston upon Hull
Doncaster Rovers F.C. players
Scunthorpe United F.C. players
Cardiff City F.C. players
Swansea City A.F.C. players
Brighton & Hove Albion F.C. players
Bradford City A.F.C. players
Margate F.C. players
Canterbury City F.C. players
Margate F.C. managers
English Football League players
Association football forwards